Rivelin Dams are a pair of water storage reservoirs situated in the upper part of the Rivelin Valley,  west of Sheffield in South Yorkshire, England. The dams are owned by Yorkshire Water and provide water to 319,000 people as well as compensation water for the River Rivelin. They are named Upper and Lower and fall just within the eastern boundary of the Peak District.

Description 
The Lower reservoir is the larger of the two and has easier public access with a tarmac road giving vehicular access to a small car park at the southern end of the dam wall. Access to the Upper reservoir and the woodland around it is by permit, there is a track with a locked gate which gives access for water board vehicles from the A57 road. Both the dam walls are faced with stone pitching in the upstream direction and have grass banking in the downstream direction. In 2005 the dam wall of the Lower reservoir underwent strengthening work undertaken by the firm Hesselberg Hydro who used open stone asphalt to face the upstream embankment.

The two reservoirs are fed by streams which drain the Hallam Moors which lie to the immediate west and stretch up to Stanage Edge. A former reservoir keeper's house stands at the northern end of the Lower reservoir's dam wall; this is now a private dwelling.

History 
Water provision for the growing city of Sheffield was taken over from the private sector by the Water Committee of Sheffield Corporation in 1830. The Rivelin Dams were part of a series of reservoirs subsequently built to the west of the city by the Committee with the Lower being completed in 1845 and the Upper in 1848. In the second half of the 19th century this compensation water often had to be provided by letting water enter the Rivelin valley from the nearby Redmires Reservoirs which was not an ideal situation. In the early 1900s it was decided to build the Rivelin Tunnel as an alternative way of providing compensation water from the Upper Derwent Valley.

Rivelin tunnel 
Construction of the tunnel began in 1903 and was completed in 1909. It was built to use the plentiful supplies of the River Derwent as compensation water for the River Rivelin rather than draining the more valuable waters of Redmires Reservoirs. The tunnel takes water which has come through a drain hole in the south east corner of  Ladybower Reservoir and delivers it into the Lower Rivelin Reservoir with the tunnel emerging into a grass covered underground tank on the south bank at a point next to where the Wyming Brook enters the Lower reservoir. The tunnel cost £135,151, which was £13,000 under budget. A series of sighting towers was constructed to aid in the survey of the tunnel. The collapsed remains of one tower can be found on Stanage Edge. An extant tower stands by the footpath adjacent to Redmires Upper Reservoir conduit. An electric railway ran through Rivelin Tunnel when it was under construction.

Rivelin water treatment works 
The water treatment works stand 800 metres east (downstream) of the dam wall of the Lower reservoir. In 2008 the Civil engineering company J.N. Bentley installed a 120 kW turbine at the inlet of the works to generate renewable energy; this energy is then used at the works.

In December 2015 work started on a £24 million project to upgrade the treatment works. The construction of a new building which will house new clarifying settlement tanks is taking place just to the west of the current works and is being carried out by the contractors Mott MacDonald Bentley. The project is due to completed by the end of 2017.

Flora and fauna 
The reservoirs are surrounded by the Wyming Brook Nature Reserve which is part of the Eastern Peak District Moors Site of Special Scientific Interest. Wildlife in the reserve includes northern spinach and common lutestring moths as well as a host of birds both on and off the water. These include crossbill, white-throated dipper, mallard, coot, moorhen and grey heron; occasional visitors include cormorant, Canada goose and osprey. The flora around the reservoirs consist mostly of deciduous and evergreen woodland; in autumn many species of fungi are on display including Jew‘s ear, plums and custard and amethyst deceiver. In recent years Yorkshire Water have conducted trials on releasing different volumes of water from the Lower reservoir and monitoring the effects on the River Rivelin. This has resulted in being able to create better conditions for brown trout spawning and an increase in the population of bullhead.

References 

Reservoirs of the Peak District
Reservoirs in South Yorkshire
Geography of Sheffield